Florentius is the name of:
 Saint Florentius (died c. 310), martyr, brother of Justin of Siponto
 Florentius (consul 361), Roman praetorian prefect  and consul
 Florentius (consul 429), high official of the Eastern Roman Empire
 Florentius Romanus Protogenes, Roman statesman, Consul in 449
 Florentius of Sardis, 5th century bishop of Sardis and theologian
 Florentius (African saint), exiled to Corsica in 484
 Florentius of Orange (died 525), bishop of Orange and saint
 Saint Florentius of Strasbourg, Bishop of Strasbourg c. 678–693
 Florentius of Peterborough, 7th century saint and martyr
 Florentius of Valeránica (born 918), Castilian monk, scribe and miniaturist
 Florentius of Worcester (died 1118), monk of Worcester, worked on the Chronicon ex chronicis
 Florentius of Carracedo (died 1156), Spanish Benedictine abbot
 Florentius or Florence of Holland (died 1210), nobleman and cleric, Chancellor of Scotland
 Florentius Radewyns (c. 1350–1400), co-founder of the Brethren of the Common Life
 Florentius Volusenus (1500s–1540s), Scottish humanist noted for De Animi Tranquillitate

See also
 Florence (disambiguation)